Kuijken (meaning "the hatched young of a bird, especially fowl"; modern Dutch spelling kuiken) is a Dutch surname. The name comes from the city of Cuijk, it is a derivative of the Celtic word Keujka with the meaning of a river meander. It may refer to:

A Belgian family of musicians
 Barthold Kuijken – baroque flute player
 Sigiswald Kuijken – conductor and baroque violin  player
 Wieland Kuijken – viol and cello player
 Marleen Kuijken-Thiers  – viola player; wife of Sigiswald Kuijken 
 Marie Kuijken – soprano and fortepianist; stage director. Daughter of Sigiswald
 Sara Kuijken – baroque violinist. Daughter of Sigiswald
 Veronica Kuijken – violinist and pianist. Daughter of Sigiswald
 Filip Kuijken – luthier in Japan
 Ivar Kuijken (b. 1987) – woodwind player. Son of Barthold
 Piet Kuijken (b. 1972) – fortepiano  player. Son of Wieland

See also 
 Susan Kuijken (born 1986), Dutch distance runner
 Friedrich Wilhelm Kücken (Low German form)
 Andreas Kück, German keyboardist

Dutch words and phrases
Archaic words and phrases
Dutch-language surnames